Utt Pataang is a 2011 Bollywood comedy thriller film, written and directed by Srikanth V. Velagaleti and features Vinay Pathak in a double role alongside, Mahie Gill, Mona Singh and Saurabh Shukla in the leading roles. The film was released on 4 February 2011, to mixed reviews and was also a commercial failure. It is inspired by Japanese film, A Stranger of Mine (2005).

Synopsis 
Ramvilas Sharma (Vinay Pathak) has just ended his live-in relationship with his girlfriend Sanjana Mahadik (Mahie Gill). His detective friend Nandu (Saurabh Shukla) sets him up with Koel Datta (Mona Singh), who has also ended her relationship with her boyfriend after finding out that he was cheating on her.

Unknown to Ram, Sanjana is having an affair with gangster Lucky Sardana (also played by Vinay Pathak). When Sanjana realizes that Lucky is using 5 crore of his money to buy a flat for his wife, Nimmi (Delnaaz Paul), she absconds with the money.

Sanjana decides to take Nandu's help in recovering her passport from Ram's place so that she can leave the country with the money. However, Nandu decides to return the money to Lucky, as he doesn't want to have anything to do with Lucky's money. He returns the bag to Lucky not realizing that Sanjana has switched the bags and has hidden the money at Ram's place.

The remainder of the movie depicts how the money causes confusion in the lives of the characters.

Cast 
 Vinay Pathak as Ram Sharma / Lucky Sardana
 Mahie Gill as Sanjana Mahadik
 Saurabh Shukla as Nandu Pandey
 Mona Singh as Koel
 Sanjay Mishra as Bolu
Brijendra Kala as Dolu
 Delnaaz Paul as Nimmi
 Govind Namdeo as Ghani Bhai (Special Appearance)
 Murli Sharma as Inspector Shinde (Special Appearance)
 Kurush Deboo as Ramvilas' Office Colleague

Reception

Critical reception 
Utt Pataang received mixed reviews from critics. Taran Adarsh from Bollywood Hungama gave it 3 out of 5 stars saying "It has a novel premise and what makes it even more appealing is the way the subject material has been executed". Namrata Joshi of Outlook India also gave it 3 out of 5 but said "No doubt the director wants to make the story-telling deep and complex but it gets unnervingly complicated and needlessly heavy and tedious. The dialogue is crisp and some scenes have a deadpan humour". Nikhat Kazmi from Times of India rated it 2.5/5 and said "Another fair is foul-foul is fair drama that has energetic bits and pieces amidst some mediocre stuff." She further stated "the narrative structure which might seem innovative to few but gets clunky and incoherent for the average viewer who might just lose patience trying to keep pace with the back and forth jumps." Renuka Rao from DNA India gave it 2.5/5 and said "Watch Utt Pataang not for sheer entertainment but for the way it pulls you into its story. An enjoyable film, Utt Pataang is definitely paisa vasool". Mayank Shekhar of Hindustan Times rated it 1.5/5 saying "You'd imagine someone read this script and thought the supposed page-turner would make for another low-budget comic hit. They didn't bother to apply any cinema at all".

Soundtrack 
The music of the film was composed by Shamir Tandon. It consists of 2 songs and 3 remixes. The music was released on Junglee Music. Lyrics were penned by Arun Kumar and Rohit Sharma.

Track listing

References

External links 

2011 films
2010s Hindi-language films
Films scored by Sanjoy Chowdhury
Indian comedy thriller films
Films scored by Shamir Tandon
Indian remakes of Japanese films
Warner Bros. films